The House of Zbaraski was a princely family of Ruthenian origin in the Crown of the Kingdom of Poland domiciled in Volhynia (today Ukraine). The name is derived from the town of Zbarazh, the core of their dominions. They were the Gediminids descended from Kaributas. The line ended in 1631, with their assets overtaken by their agnates, the Wiśniowiecki family. A branch of the princes Nieświcki family.

Coat of arms
The Zbarski family used the Korybut coat of arms.

Notable family members
 Siemion "Starszy" Zbaraski (died after 1481), married Katarzyna Cebrowska z Cebra h. Hołobok, the founder of the Princes Zbaraski line
Andrzej Zbaraski (1498-1540), married Helena Herburt h. Herburt
 Mikołaj Zbaraski (c.1540-1574), starost of Krzemieniec, married NN Kozica and Hanna Branković
 Janusz Zbaraski (c.1553-1608), voivode of Bracław, married Princes Hanna Czetwertyńska h. Pogoń Ruska
 Jerzy Zbaraski (c. 1573–1631), castelan of Kraków, the last male representative of the Zbaraski family
 Krzysztof Zbaraski (1580–1627), Great Koniuszy of the Crown
Stefan Zbaraski (1540-1585), voivode of Witebsk and Troki, married Hanna Zabrzezińska h. Leliwa, Nastazja Mscisławska h. Pogoń Litewska and Dorota Firlej h. Lewart
Piotr Zbaraski (born 1548), married Barbara Jordan h. Trąby
Barbara Zbaraska (died 1602), married voivode of Lublin Count Gabriel Tęczyński h. Topór 
Jerzy Zbaraski (died 1580), married Szczęsna Nasiłkowska h. Półkozic and Barbara Kozińska 
Władysław Zbaraski (died c. 1581), starost of Botok, married Zofia Przyłuska h. Lubicz
Małgorzata Zbaraska (died before 1540), married Stanisław Czermiński z Czermina h. Wieniawa
Elżbieta Zbaraska (died before 1540), married Wacław Bawor h. Złota Wolność and Walenty Wkryński h. Grzymała
Michał Zbaraski Wiśniowiecki (c. 1517), brother of Siemion "Starszy" Zbaraski the founder of the princes Wiśniowiecki line

Palaces

See also
 House of Porycki
 House of Woroniecki

References

External links
 Zbaraski in the Encyclopedia of Ukraine, vol. 5 (1993).
 Michał Czechowski. "Zbarasccy, Wiśniowieccy, Poryccy, Woronieccy: family tree schema" (in Polish)
 

 
Polish noble families
Gediminids